The 2013–14 season is Eastern Sports Club 59th season in the Hong Kong First Division League, as well as their debut season after their promotion to the top-tier division in 2012–13 season. The club has competed in the First Division League, as well as Senior Challenge Shield and FA Cup.

Key events
 26 May 2013: Brazilian striker Giovane Alves da Silva joins the club from fellow First Division club Biu Chun Rangers on a free transfer.
 1 June 2013: Hong Kong defender Pak Wing Chak joins the club from fellow First Division club Sunray Cave JC Sun Hei for an undisclosed fee.
 1 June 2013: Hong Kong striker Leung Tsz Chun joins the club from fellow First Division club Sunray Cave JC Sun Hei for an undisclosed fee.
 2 June 2013: Hong Kong midfielder Lau Nim Yat joins the club from Biu Chun Rangers on a free transfer.
 2 June 2013: Hong Kong goalkeeper Li Hon Ho joins the club from newly relegated Second Division club Wofoo Tai Po for free.
 2 June 2013: Brazilian defender Clayton Michel Afonso joins the club from newly relegated Second Division club Wofoo Tai Po on a free transfer.
 11 June 2013: The club announces the 22-men squad for the new season. Only Leung Chi Wing, Wong Chun Hin, Wong Chun Yue, Yiu Ho Ming, Lau Ho Lam and Wong Tsz Ho stay at the club.
 11 June 2013: Hong Kong goalkeeper Chung Ho Yin and midfielder Lo Kai Wah confirm their retirement and will stay at the club for coaching work.
 11 June 2013: Brazilian midfielder Diego Eli Moreira joins the club from fellow First Division club Tuen Mun on a free transfer.
 11 June 2013: Hong Kong defender Wong Chin Hung joins the club from fellow First Division club Biu Chun Rangers for free.
 11 June 2013: Brazilian midfielder Itaparica joins the club from fellow First Division club South China on a free. transfer 
 11 June 2013: Chinese-born Hongkonger midfielder Li Haiqiang joins the club from fellow First Division club Tuen Mun on a free transfer.
 11 June 2013: Hong Kong midfielder Man Pei Tak joins the club from fellow First Division club South China on a free transfer.
 11 June 2013: Hong Kong defender Tse Man Wing joins the club from fellow First Division club Royal Southern on a free transfer.
 11 June 2013: Brazilian defender Beto joins the club from fellow First Division club Tuen Mun on a free transfer.
 11 June 2013: Hong Kong defender Leung Kwok Wai joins the club from fellow First Division club Yokohama FC Hong Kong on a free transfer.
 11 June 2013: Hong Kong defender Kwok Wing Sun joins the club from fellow First Division club Tuen Mun for an undisclosed fee.
 11 June 2013: Brazilian goalkeeper Paulo César da Silva Argolo joins the club from Brazilian club Esporte Clube Novo Hamburgo on a free transfer.
 19 June 2013: Neutralised Hong Kong former footballer Cristiano Cordeiro joins the club as an assistant coach.
 19 June 2013: Hong Kong striker Cheng Siu Wai joins the club from fellow First Division club Kitchee for an undisclosed fee.
 27 June 2013: The Hong Kong Football Association assigns Shing Mun Valley Sports Ground as Eastern Salon's home ground in the following season.
 16 September 2013: Hong Kong defender Kwok Wing Sun and midfielder Wong Chun Hin joins fellow First Division club Sunray Cave JC Sun Hei on a season long loan.
 1 January 2014: Hong Kong defender Wong Chi Chung joins the club from fellow First Division club Tuen Mun for an undisclosed fee.
 1 January 2014: Hong Kong goalkeeper Leung Man Lai joins the club from fellow First Division club Happy Valley for an undisclosed fee.
 1 January 2014: Hong Kong midfielder Li Ka Chun joins the club from fellow First Division club Biu Chun Rangers for an undisclosed fee.
 3 January 2014: Hong Kong defender Lau Nim Yat is released by the club.
 10 January 2014: Chinese striker Liang Zicheng joins the club from fellow First Division club Yokohama FC Hong Kong for a transfer fee of HKD$150,000.
 13 January 2014: Australian striker Dylan Macallister joins the club from A-League clubn Melbourne Heart for an undisclosed fee.
 17 January 2014: Hong Kong defender Pak Wing Chak leaves the club and join fellow First Division club Royal Southern on loan until the end of the season.

Players

Squad information

Last update: 1 January 2014
Source:
Ordered by squad number.
LPLocal player; FPForeign player; NRNon-registered player

Reserves
 As of 11 June 2013

Transfers

In

Out

Loan In

Loan out

Club

Coaching staff

Squad statistics

Overall Stats
{|class="wikitable" style="text-align: center;"
|-
!width="100"|
!width="60"|First Division
!width="60"|Senior Shield
!width="60"|FA Cup
!width="60"|Total Stats
|-
|align=left|Games played    ||  16 ||  3  || 2  || 21
|-
|align=left|Games won       ||  5  ||  1  || 2  || 8
|-
|align=left|Games drawn     ||  6  ||  1  || 0  || 7
|-
|align=left|Games lost      ||  5  ||  1  || 0  || 6
|-
|align=left|Goals for       ||  32 ||  8  || 4  || 44
|-
|align=left|Goals against   ||  32 ||  7  || 1  || 40
|- =
|align=left|Players used    ||  21 ||  15 || 15 || 211
|-
|align=left|Yellow cards    ||  49 ||  14 || 5  || 68
|-
|align=left|Red cards       ||  1  ||  1  || 1  || 3
|-

Players Used: Eastern Salon have used a total of 21 different players in all competitions.

Squad Stats

Top scorers

Last update: 12 April 2014

Disciplinary record

Substitution Record
Includes all competitive matches.

Last updated: 12 April 2014

Captains

Competitions

Overall

First Division League

Classification

Results summary

Results by round

Matches

Pre-season friendlies

First Division League

Senior Shield

FA Cup

Notes

References

Eastern Sports Club seasons
Eas